Fejzo Shenaj (born 24 November 1984 in Gjirokastër) is an Albanian footballer who most recently played for Shkumbini Peqin in the Albanian First Division.

Club career
He had spells with different clubs between 2003 and 2014, most notably with Shkumbini Peqin.

In April 2014, it was reported Shenaj and his wife were missing for several months after he allegedly received death threats due to suspected debts. He however returned to hometown club Luftëtari four months later.

References

External links
 Profile - FSHF

1984 births
Living people
Footballers from Gjirokastër
Albanian footballers
Association football midfielders
Luftëtari Gjirokastër players
KS Shkumbini Peqin players
KS Kastrioti players
FK Dinamo Tirana players
Kategoria Superiore players
Kategoria e Parë players